Najafabad (also Romanized as Najafābād and Nejafābād; also known as Najafābād-e Pā’īn, Najaf Abad ‘Olya, and Najaf Abad Sofla) is a village in Bidak Rural District, in the Central District of Abadeh County, Fars Province, Iran. At the 2006 census, its population was 78, in 29 families.

References 

Populated places in Abadeh County